"Franz Kemper" was a pseudonym used by the Tocqueville scholar and anti-Nazi activist Jacob-Peter Mayer in the 1933 edition of Konstantin Frantz's Masse oder Volk (published by Alfred Protte), which Mayer edited and introduced.

References

Pseudonymous writers